Michael Prescott (born 1960, as Douglas Child Borton, Jr. )  is a contemporary American, New York Times bestselling writer of crime fiction.

Early life
Douglas Child Borton, Jr. was born to Doris Ann (née Kleen) Borton and Douglas Child Borton, Sr., and grew up in New Jersey. He graduated from Wesleyan University in 1980, where he majored in Film Studies.

Career
Prescott moved to Los Angeles in 1981, and there he worked as a freelance magazine article writer, archival researcher, editor, and wrote scripts for independent film producers. In 1986, he sold his first novel, which was in the horror genre. In 1992, under the pseudonym Brian Harper, he switched to crime and suspense novels, most of which are set in Los Angeles or in Arizona. He has contributed short stories to several anthologies.

Bibliography

Written as Douglas Borton
 Kane (1990)

Written as Brian Harper
 Shiver (1992)
 Shudder (1994)
 Shatter (1995)
 Deadly Pursuit (1995)
 Blind Pursuit (1997)
 Mortal Pursuit (1998)

Written as Michael Prescott
 Comes the Dark (1999)
 Stealing Faces (1999)
 The Shadow Hunter (2000) (German version: Die Stalkerjägerin, Translator: Olaf Knechten, 2014)
 Last Breath (2002)
 Next Victim (2002)
 In Dark Places (2004)
 Dangerous Games (2005)
 Mortal Faults (2006)
 Final Sins (2007)
 Riptide (2010)
 Grave of Angels (2012)

Written as Owen Fusterbuster
 Die Stupid (2011)

References

External links
Official website
Official blog

1960 births
Living people
People from Los Angeles
20th-century American novelists
21st-century American novelists
American crime fiction writers
American horror writers
American male novelists
Wesleyan University alumni
20th-century American male writers
21st-century American male writers
Novelists from California